Jeon Jun-ho (born February 15, 1969) is a retired South Korean professional baseball outfielder who played for the Lotte Giants, the Hyundai Unicorns, and the Heroes in the Korea Baseball Organization.

Jeon is the all-time stolen base leader in the KBO League, with 550 career steals. He led the league in triples five times, in 1995 and 1996, and from 2002 to 2004. He is also one of the few hitters to surpass 2,000 career hits in the KBO League, with 2,018.

See also 
 List of KBO career stolen bases leaders
 List of KBO career hits leaders

References

External links
Career statistics and player information from Korea Baseball Organization

Jeon Jun-ho at NC Dinos Baseball Company

1969 births
Living people
People from Changwon
NC Dinos coaches
SSG Landers coaches
Kiwoom Heroes players
Hyundai Unicorns players
Lotte Giants players
KBO League outfielders
South Korean baseball players
Yeungnam University alumni
Sportspeople from South Gyeongsang Province